Mayo is a village in Yukon, Canada, along the Silver Trail and the Stewart River. It had a population of 200 in 2016. The Yukon Bureau of Statistics estimated a population of 496 in 2019. It is also the home of the First Nation of Na-Cho Nyäk Dun, whose primary language is Northern Tutchone. Na-Cho Nyäk Dun translates into "big river people." 

The community, formerly called Mayo Landing, is serviced by Mayo Airport. The village was named after former circus acrobat turned settler and explorer Alfred Mayo.

Its only school is J. V. Clark School, which is named after James Vincent Clark (1924–1994). The school had about 70 students in 2012. As of the 2020/2021 school year, the acting principal is Nicholas Vienneau.

History
Before Europeans came there were in the area two communities of the Na-cho Nyäk Dun people, who lived by hunting and trapping. The river now known as the Stewart River was known as the "Náhcho Nyäk" ('Great River'). The people lived across the Stewart River from the main focus of today's Mayo, in a district today called "Old Mayo village". The old settlement was reinstated on the initiative of a missionary, but in 1934 the river burst its banks and flattened much of the old village, destroying the church and many cultural treasures.

The first gold discoveries in the area were made in the 1880s: silver was also discovered some time later. Till the mid-twentieth century Mayo was connected with the outside world by the river and received any supplies by boat. In the 1950s the construction of the Klondike Highway and the Silver Trail provided Mayo with a road link to Stewart Crossing.

Between 1973 and 1984 negotiation took place between the government and the northern Tutchone leaders over land rights and self-government.

Together with the Tr'ondek Hwech’in First Nation an agreement has been made with Yukon Energy to supply electricity to Dawson City using the Mayo-Dawson Power Line.

May 2008 saw a preliminary agreement with Alexco Resource Corp concerning silver extraction in the Keno Hill Silver area near the far end of Mayo lake where the corporation operates approximately 40 silver mines.

Geography

Climate 
Mayo has a subarctic climate (Koppen: Dfc), with generally warm summers and severely cold winters lasting half the year. Spring and autumn are very short transitional seasons between summer and winter, with average temperatures rising and falling very fast during these times.

Demographics 

See also 
 List of municipalities in Yukon

References

External links 

Northern Tutchone
Villages in Yukon